St. Thomas Evangelical Church of India (STECI) is an Oriental Protestant (Reformed Orthodox) episcopal denomination based in Kerala, India. It derives from a schism in the Malankara Mar Thoma Syrian Church in 1961 and forms a part of the Saint Thomas Syrian Christian community. The church is engaged in active witnessing and building up of faith communities that will witness the love of God and serving people around in need. The headquarters of the church is at Tiruvalla, Kerala.

History

The St. Thomas Evangelical Church is one of several groups of Saint Thomas Christians claiming origins to St. Thomas the Apostle who, according to their tradition, came to India in AD 52. While STECI is considered to be an episcopal church, it is also deeply influenced by evangelicalism. Until 1961, the church's history was deeply connected to the Malankara Mar Thoma Syrian Church, and South Indian Christianity's contact with Evangelical British missionaries during British colonial times. The missionaries facilitated the translation of the Bible into Malayalam in 1811. This was the first vernacular Bible in Kerala. Further changes introduced by the influence of missionaries led to a schism within the Thomas Christians.

Bishops
 Bishop KN Oommen (Late)
 Bishop P John Varughese (Late)
 Bishop Dr. TC Cherian (Retd.)
 Bishop Dr. MK Koshy (Retd.)
 Bishop A.I Alexander (Retd.)
 Bishop Dr CV Mathew (Retd.)
 Bishop Most Rev Dr Thomas Abraham (Presiding Bishop)
 Bishop Rt Rev Dr Abraham Chacko (Prathinidhi sabha Adhyakshan)

STECI Boards
 Board for Evangelistic Work
 Board for Youth Work
 Board for Women's Work
 Board for Sunday School Work
 Education Board 
 Department of Music & Communications

References

Christian organizations established in 1961
Evangelicalism in India
1961 establishments in Kerala
Evangelical denominations in Asia
Christianity in Kerala
Thiruvalla
Saint Thomas Christians